Levan Township is one of sixteen townships in Jackson County, Illinois, USA.  As of the 2010 census, its population was 850 and it contained 365 housing units.

Geography

Adjacent townships
 Ora Township (north)
 Vergennes Township (northeast)
 Somerset Township (east)
 Murphysboro Township (southeast)
 Sand Ridge Township (south)
 Fountain Bluff Township (southwest)
 Kinkaid Township (west)
 Bradley Township (northwest)

Cemeteries
The township contains these two cemeteries: Bartlett and Lone Oak.

Major highways
  Illinois Route 149

Landmarks
 Lake Murphysboro State Park (northwest half)

Demographics

School districts
 Elverado Community Unit School District 196
 Murphysboro Community Unit School District 186
 Trico Community Unit School District 176

Political districts
 Illinois' 12th congressional district
 State House District 115
 State Senate District 58

References
 
 United States Census Bureau 2007 TIGER/Line Shapefiles
 United States National Atlas

External links
 City-Data.com
 Illinois State Archives

Townships in Jackson County, Illinois
Townships in Illinois